Thomas E. "Thom" Petersen is an American government official, lobbyist, and farmer serving as commissioner of the Minnesota Department of Agriculture. Peterson was appointed to the position by Governor Tim Walz in January 2019, succeeding David Frederickson.

Education 
Petersen earned an Associate degree from Normandale Community College and took courses at the University of Minnesota and University of Georgia.

Career 
Petersen owns and operates a farming business. For 15 years, he worked as the director of government relations at the Minnesota Farmers Union, in which he was tasked with lobbying members of the United States Congress and Minnesota Legislature.

Personal life 
Petersen lives with his wife and two sons in Pine City, Minnesota.

References

Living people
State cabinet secretaries of Minnesota
State agriculture commissioners in the United States
People from Pine City, Minnesota
1964 births